The fifteenth series of Made in Chelsea, a British structured-reality television programme began airing on 12 March 2018 on E4, and concluded on 28 May 2018 following eleven episodes, and an "End of Season Party" special hosted by Ellie Taylor. Ahead of the series it was announced that Tiff Watson had quit the show for good, having previously announced that she'd just be taking a break. New cast members for this series include Melissa Tattam and Miles Nazaire, as well as Heloise "Ell" Agostinelli and Tabitha Willett who joined later in the series. Stanley Johnson also made his first appearance during this series with Toff following their appearances together in the seventeenth series of I'm a Celebrity...Get Me Out of Here! This was the final series to include cast members Clementine Cuthbertson and Frankie Gaff, who quit the midway through the series. This series heavily focused on the breakups and makeups of Digby and Olivia's troubled relationship, as well as the strain on Louise and Ryan when her ex-boyfriend Alik moves back to London. It also includes Sam T attempting to move on from his last girlfriend, and Harry and Melissa's blossoming romance.

Cast

Episodes

{| class="wikitable plainrowheaders" style="width:100%; background:#fff;"
! style="background:#D069FF;"| Seriesno.
! style="background:#D069FF;"| Episodeno.
! style="background:#D069FF;"| Title
! style="background:#D069FF;"| Original air date
! style="background:#D069FF;"| Duration
! style="background:#D069FF;"| UK viewers

|}

Ratings

External links

References

2018 British television seasons
Made in Chelsea seasons